The William D. Bishop Cottage Development Historic District, also known as the Cottage Park Historic District, encompasses a historic planned working-class residential community in the South End of Bridgeport, Connecticut.  The district most prominently includes 35 -story wood-frame cottages with Carpenter Gothic styling, developed in 1880 and 1881 by the Bishop Realty Company and probably designed by Palliser, Palliser & Company.  It was one of the first such planned developments in the city, and was listed on the National Register of Historic Places in 1982.

Description and history
Cottage Park is located in Bridgeport's South End, just north of the northeastern tip of Seaside Park. The cottages that make up its principal defining feature are primarily located on Atlantic Street and Cottage Place, which run east–west between Broad and Main. All 35 cottages are frame structures with clapboarded walls, board-and-batten gables, and Gothic trim. The cottages on Atlantic Street exhibit more variety than those on Cottage Place, with the one at Atlantic and Main in particular featuring a tower with pyramidal roof.

The development was the idea of William Darius Bishop, a wealthy local businessman and one-term Congressman.  The cottages were apparently built to designs (or minor variants) from published works of Palliser, Palliser & Company, a Bridgeport-based architectural firm whose pattern books sold nationwide.  The Palliser firm also designed the brick row house at 256-270 Broad Street, which is included in this district.  The development was sited to be near the downtown and waterfront, and for its proximity to Seaside Park, which would provide recreational opportunities for the residents.

See also
National Register of Historic Places listings in Bridgeport, Connecticut

References

National Register of Historic Places in Fairfield County, Connecticut
Gothic Revival architecture in Connecticut
Queen Anne architecture in Connecticut
Historic districts in Fairfield County, Connecticut
Buildings and structures in Bridgeport, Connecticut
Historic districts on the National Register of Historic Places in Connecticut